Sonia Khan is a Pakistani film and television actress. She has worked in Urdu, Punjabi, Sindhi and Pashto films.

Personal life
She is ethnically of Pashtun origins. Sonia married Tariq Mir at the age of 22. Tariq Mir and Sonia first met during the shooting of a drama. According to them, the first encounter consisted of detailed conversation, but no one had the idea that they would get married later. Sonia left showbiz two months before her marriage, but the reason was not Tariq Mir. There were some other reasons. Social values were crumbling. Sometimes, the area Superintendent of Police would visit her home. Sometimes, some factory-owner would tour her residence.

Career
Her family did not belong to showbiz. One of her cousins, Gul Hina, married the actor, Rangeela. That led Sonia to enter showbiz. She was 7 that time. She and Rangeela were neighbours. After marriage, two houses merged into one, where film shootings were common. Renowned artists, directors, and producers would visit her home. During the late 1970s, whenever child actors were required for any movie scene, Rangeela would take her to shoot along with other children.

During the late 1970s, she marked her entry as a child star; in the 1980s, she signed 12 films during her first-ever film shooting. During her career spanning over the period of 10-12-year (1982 -1993), Sonia worked in 70 Urdu and Punjabi films. She also worked as an actress and model in various serials and long-plays of PTV Lahore and Quetta Centres, TV commercials, and theatre.

She left Lollywood at the peak of her career to marry Tariq Mir – and later relocated to Norway; where she established a welfare organization along with her participation in domestic tasks. She also tried her luck in dress and jewelry designing. She has also authored a book, Aadhi Sadi Mein Kitni Sadiyaan.

In 2016, she made her comeback as a television actress after fifteen years with a drama serial Saya-e-Dewar Bhi Nahi (2016).

Movies 
 Do Bheege Badan 
 Direct Hawaldar 
 Dhanak 
 Teri Bahon Mein 
 Haseeno ki Barat 
 Chunbalee 
 Sahiba 
 Iqraar 
 Sapni 
 Shehnai 
 Aag 
 Jeet  
 Pyar Tera Mera

TV Plays 
 Suraj k Sath Sath (PTV)
 Khahish (PTV)
 Madar (PTV)
 Rozan (PTV)
 Saya e Deewar Bhi Nahi /2016 (Hum TV)
 Dill e Beqrar 2018 (A Plus TV)
 Skitten Snø 2019 Norwegian national TV (NRK)

Books 

* Aadhi Sadi mein kitni sadian (Poetry Book) (آدھی صدی میں کتنی صدیاں (شاعری کی کتاب

References

Living people
Pakistani television actresses
Pakistani film actresses
20th-century Pakistani actresses
21st-century Pakistani actresses
Actresses in Punjabi cinema
Actresses in Urdu cinema
Actresses in Pashto cinema
Actresses in Sindhi cinema
Pashtun women
1968 births